King of the Gypsies is a 1978 American drama film by Paramount Pictures starring Eric Roberts (in his film debut), Sterling Hayden, Shelley Winters, Susan Sarandon, Brooke Shields, Annette O'Toole and Judd Hirsch.

Originally planned to be directed by Peter Bogdanovich, the film was finally directed by Frank Pierson from a screenplay which he adapted from the 1975 book King of the Gypsies by Peter Maas. The book tells the story of Steve Tene and his Gypsy family.

Plot
The film deals with the criminal ways and turbulent lives of a group of modern-day Gypsies living in the early 1960s of New York City. While on his deathbed their "king", Zharko Stepanowicz, passes his position of leadership on to his unwilling grandson, Dave. In spite of Dave's reluctance to become the Gypsies' new leader, Dave's father, Groffo, resentful over not having been appointed leader, attempts to have Dave killed. Groffo is scheming and temperamental, and uses violence and threats to get the clan to do his bidding. Eventually this leads to a major confrontation with his son, and the film ends with the suggestion that Dave has finally accepted his legacy; with his voiceover considering the possibility of his bringing the rest of the tradition-bound Gypsies into the world of 20th Century customs and lifestyles.

Cast
 Eric Roberts as Dave Stepanowicz
 Sterling Hayden as King Zharko Stepanowicz 
 Judd Hirsch as Groffo Stepanowicz
 Shelley Winters as Queen Rachel Stepanowicz
 Susan Sarandon as Rose Giorgio Stepanowicz
 Brooke Shields as Tita Stepanowicz
Danielle Brisebois as Young Tita Stepanowicz
 Annette O'Toole as Sharon
 Annie Potts as Persa 
 Michael V. Gazzo as Spiro Giorgio 
 Antonia Rey as Danitza Giorgio 
 Matthew Laborteaux as Middle Dave Stepanowicz
 Roy Brocksmith as Frinkuleschti
 Faith Minton as Gypsy (uncredited)

See also
King of the Gypsies
King of the Travellers

References

External links
 
 
 
 

1978 films
1978 drama films
American drama films
Films based on American novels
Films directed by Frank Pierson
Films set in New York City
Films shot in New Jersey
Films shot in New York City
Paramount Pictures films
Films about Romani people
Kings of the Gypsies
Films produced by Dino De Laurentiis
1970s English-language films
1970s American films